Santa Fe Place is an enclosed shopping center in Santa Fe, New Mexico. Formerly named Villa Linda Mall, Santa Fe Place is one of two enclosed malls in Santa Fe. Santa Fe Place is the largest mall in Northern New Mexico, and fourth in the state.

History

Developed by Herring Marathon Group, Villa Linda Mall opened in 1985. The mall changed hands frequently around the turn of the century. Its ownership changed from First Union in 1997 to Zamias Services, Inc. in 1999, then to General Growth Properties in 2001.

After being purchased by Greenfield and Associates in fall 2004, the mall underwent a $10 million renovation that included a new roof. The mall celebrated its grand opening as Santa Fe Place in November 2005. Babcock & Brown purchased the mall in 2007 followed by Trademark Property in 2010.

Spinoso Real Estate Group owned and managed the property between 2014 and 2023. Ownership undertook significant renovations and upgrades to the common area during 2014-15 and to the food court in 2019. In 2021, Spinoso Real Estate Group announced plans to develop "Escarpa", a luxury three story apartment complex on the property. The following year, plans to construct a Residence Inn on the northeast side of the property were also announced.

Kohan Retail Investment Group purchased the property in 2023.

Stores

The mall's present anchor stores are JCPenney, Dillard's, Conn's and Hobby Lobby. One of the original anchor stores, Bealls, closed in 1989 to make way for the northern United Artists theater, which opened in 1991. Mervyn's was also one of the original anchors, but closed in 2008 due to bankruptcy. Sports Authority took Mervyn's former location in 2013. Around that same time Shoe Pavilion also went bankrupt, leaving a large vacant location. JCPenney moved from Santa Fe's first mall, De Vargas Center, Sears moved from its Downtown location. In 2011, United Artists North, then known as the only "discount theater" in Santa Fe, closed. In 2016, Cost Plus World Market and Bed Bath & Beyond opened stores there. Sports Authority closed in 2016 due to bankruptcy. Conn's HomePlus took over the space in 2022. In 2017, Sears shuttered its Santa Fe location. During the same year, Victoria's Secret relocated, renovated and added Pink to their location, H&M, Torrid and Forever 21 opened new-to-market locations, while Regal Cinemas (formerly United Artists) announced its return to the center after a full renovation of the space. In 2019, arts and crafts store Hobby Lobby relocated to the center, occupying the former Sears location. In October of 2022 a new to market 2nd & Charles was announced, occupying the last remaining part of the old Mervyn's.

Name change
The mall has had one name change since its grand opening. In 2005, the "Villa Linda Mall" changed to "Santa Fe Place".

Anchor tenants 
JCPenney
Dillard's 
Bed Bath & Beyond 
Cost Plus World Market
Hobby Lobby
Conn's

Junior anchors
Forever 21
H&M
Shoe Department Encore

Food court
Originally the food court at Santa Fe Place was named El Mercado. The food court hosted 12 restaurants, an arcade, and the United Artists South movie theater. After changing management, El Mercado was changed to The Market, after renovation. The Market can house 6 restaurants, due to Foot Action previously occupying the other half of the court. When renovated, the seating area was leveled. In 2020, Spinoso Real Estate Group remodeled the food court, along with adding a Ropes Course as the centerpiece. Rad Retrocade also will fill the former Jets Arcade location.

References

External links
 
 Spinoso Real Estate Group

Buildings and structures in Santa Fe, New Mexico
Shopping malls established in 1985
Shopping malls in New Mexico
Tourist attractions in Santa Fe, New Mexico
1985 establishments in New Mexico